Dnešice is a municipality and village in Plzeň-South District in the Plzeň Region of the Czech Republic. It has about 800 inhabitants.

Administrative parts
The village of Černotín is an administrative part of Dnešice.

References

Villages in Plzeň-South District